Shri Ram Centennial School, or SRCS Indore, is an educational institution established by the Shri Ram Educational Trust and the Prabodh Foundation in Indore, Madhya Pradesh, India.

References

Schools in Indore
Education in Indore
Boarding schools in Madhya Pradesh